Comarapa Airport  is a public use airport located near Comarapa, Santa Cruz, Bolivia.

See also

Transport in Bolivia
List of airports in Bolivia

References

External links 
 Airport record for Comarapa Airport at Landings.com

Airports in Santa Cruz Department (Bolivia)